Mount Chephren is a mountain located in the Mistaya River Valley of Banff National Park, Canada.

Mount Chephren was named after Chephren, the 4th Dynasty Egyptian pharaoh. The mountain was originally named Pyramid Mountain in 1897 by J. Norman Collie, but it conflicted with an identically named peak in Jasper National Park, so it was renamed in 1924 to its present name.

Routes

Scramble
Mount Chephren is rated a difficult scramble on the south face due to its steep upper slopes with possible snow and ice difficulties. Considerable snow on the route would likely require crampons and an ice axe, thereby pushing the climb into the realm of technical mountaineering. The best conditions for scrambling would normally be late July and August.

The trail head is located at the west end of the Waterfowl Lakes campground off the Icefields Parkway in Banff National Park.

Technical
There are three main routes:
 South Face/West Ridge (Normal Route) II
 East Face V 5.9 A1
 The Wild Thing VI 5.9 A3 WI4

Geology

Like other mountains in Banff Park, Mount Chephren is composed of sedimentary rock laid down during the Precambrian to Jurassic periods. Formed in shallow seas, this sedimentary rock was pushed east and over the top of younger rock during the Laramide orogeny.

Climate

Based on the Köppen climate classification, Mount Chephren is located in a subarctic climate zone with cold, snowy winters, and mild summers.

References

Notes

Three-thousanders of Alberta
Mountains of Banff National Park